Khaneqah (also Romanized as Khāneqāh and Khānqāh; also known as Khānegāh) is a village in Hir Rural District, Hir District, Ardabil County, Ardabil Province, Iran. At the 2006 census, its population was 469, in 112 families.

References 

Tageo

Towns and villages in Ardabil County